Thomas J. Whelan (January 28, 1922 – July 31, 2002) was an American politician who served as the mayor of Jersey City, New Jersey, from 1963 to 1971.

Biography
Whelan was born in Jersey City on January 28, 1922 as one of thirteen children to Joseph J. and Charlotte Vogel Whelan.

Whelan flew 63 missions in World War II as a pilot in the Army Air Force. He later became the chief security officer of New Jersey Bell Telephone Co.

A Democrat, Whelan was appointed mayor in 1963 when his predecessor, Thomas Gangemi, was forced to resign over a question about his citizenship. Whelan then ran for mayor in 1965 and again in 1969, winning both times.

In 1971, during his second term, Whelan was indicted by the U.S. Attorney's Office for the District of New Jersey as a member of the "Hudson County Eight," and was convicted in federal court of conspiracy and extortion in a multimillion-dollar political kickback scheme connected to city and county contracts.

Convicted along with him was former mayor and political boss, John V. Kenny and former City Council president Thomas Flaherty. Whelan served seven years of a 15-year sentence in the federal penitentiary in Lewisburg, Pennsylvania.

Whelan died on July 31, 2002, at home in Naples, Florida, aged 80.

References

1922 births
2002 deaths
Mayors of Jersey City, New Jersey
Politicians convicted of extortion under color of official right
New Jersey Democrats
New Jersey politicians convicted of corruption
New Jersey politicians convicted of crimes
20th-century American politicians
United States Army Air Forces pilots of World War II